Salvia paohsingensis is a perennial plant that is native to Sichuan province in China, growing in forests at   elevation. It is related to Salvia maximowicziana.

Notes

paohsingensis
Flora of China